Cornet Bay is a bay in the U.S. state of Washington.

Cornet Bay was named after John Cornet, a pioneer settler.

References

Bays of Island County, Washington
Bays of Washington (state)